A. ferruginea may refer to:
 Abarema ferruginea, a legume species
 Acacia ferruginea, a legume species found only in Sri Lanka
 Aegiphila ferruginea, a plant species endemic to Ecuador
 Albizia ferruginea, a plant species found in Angola, Benin and Cameroon
 Aniba ferruginea, a plant species endemic to Venezuela
 Anisophyllea ferruginea, a plant species found in Brunei, Indonesia and Malaysia
 Azbukinia ferruginea, a fungus species

See also
 Ferruginea (disambiguation)